Marguerite is a French female given name, from which the English name Margaret is derived. Marguerite derives via Latin and Greek μαργαρίτης (margarítēs) meaning "pearl". It is also a French name for the ox-eye daisy flower. Those with the name include:

People

Nobility 

 Margaret of Bourbon (1438–1483) or Marguerite de Bourbon, Princess of Savoy by marriage
 Margaret of France (1553–1615) or Marguerite de Valois, wife of Henry IV of France and Navarre
 Margaret of France, Duchess of Berry or Marguerite de Valois (1523–1574), daughter of King Francis I of France
 Margaret, Countess of Anjou or Marguerite d'Angou (1273–1299), Countess of Anjou and Maine in her own right and Countess of Valois, Alençon, Chartres and Perche by marriage
 Marguerite de Navarre (1492–1549), princess of France, Queen of Navarre and Duchess of Alençon and Berry
 Marguerite III de Neufchâtel (1480–1544), German-Roman monarch as Princess Abbess of the Imperial Remiremont Abbey in France
 Marguerite Louise d'Orléans (1645–1721), Grand Duchess of Tuscany by marriage
 Marguerite of Lorraine (1615–1672), princess of Lorraine and Duchess of Orléans by marriage
 Marguerite, Baroness de Reuter (1912–2009), European aristocrat and member of the family that founded the Reuters news service
 Marguerite, bâtarde de France (1407–1458), illegitimate daughter of Charles VI and Odette de Champdivers, legitimized by Charles VII
 Marguerite, Duchess of Rohan (1617–1684), French noblewoman
 Princess Marguerite Adélaïde of Orléans (1846–1893), princess of France and, by marriage, princess of the House of Czartoryski

Other 

 Marguerite Bériza (1880–after 1930), French opera soprano
 Marguerite Bourgeoys (1620–1700), saint and founder of the Congregation of Notre Dame, Montreal, Quebec, Canada
 Marguerite Broquedis (1893–1983), French tennis player
 Marguerite Carré (1880–1947), French opera soprano
 Marguerite Charpentier (1848-1904), French art collector and salonist
 Marguerite Davis (1887–1967), American chemist, co-discoverer of vitamins A and B
 Marguerite de Angeli (1889–1987), American writer and illustrator of children's books
 Marguerite De La Motte (1902–1950), American film actress
 Marguerite de la Sablière (c. 1640–1693), French salonist and polymath
 Marguerite Derricks (born 1961), American choreographer
 Marguerite Duras (1914–1996), French writer and film director
 Marguerite Fourrier (fl. 1900), French tennis player
 Marguerite Frank (born 1927), American−French mathematician
 Marguerite Georges (1787–1867), noted French actress who had an affair with Napoleon
 Marguerite Henry (1902–1997), American writer of children's books
 Marguerite Higgins Hall (1920-1966), American war correspondent and first woman to win the Pulitzer Prize for Foreign Correspondence for her coverage of the Korean War
 Marguerite Kirmse (1885–1954), British-American artist
 Marguerite L. Smith (1894–1985), New York assemblywoman 1920–1921
 Marguerite Vincent Lawinonkié (1783-1865), Huron-Wendat craftswoman
 Marguerite Long (1874–1966), French pianist and teacher
 Marguerite St. Leon Loud (1812-1889), American poet and writer
 Marguerite Moore (1849–?), Irish-Catholic orator, patriot, activist
 Marguerite Moreau (born 1977), American actress
 Marguerite Narbel (1918–2010), Swiss biologist and politician
 Marguerite Norris (1927–1994), Detroit Red Wings team president, first female NHL team executive, first woman to have her name engraved on the Stanley Cup
 Marguerite Perey (1909–1975), French physicist
 Marguerite Pindling (born 1932), Governor-General of the Bahamas beginning 2014
 Marguerite Porter Zwicker (1904–1993), Canadian watercolor painter and art promoter
 Marguerite Quinn, American politician elected to the Pennsylvania House of Representatives in 2006
 Marguerite Scypion (c. 1770s–after 1836), African-Natchez slave who filed the first "freedom suit" and ended Indian slavery in the state of Missouri in 1836
 Marguerite Yourcenar (1903–1987), Belgian-born French novelist and essayist, first woman elected to the Académie française
 Marguerite Zorach (1887–1968), American painter, textile artist and graphic designer
 Maya Angelou (1928–2014), American author, poet, dancer, actress and singer, born Marguerite Annie Johnson
 Saint Marguerite d'Youville (1701-1771), French Canadian widow who founded the Order of Sisters of Charity of Montreal

Fictional characters

As a given name
 Marguerite St. Just, wife of the Scarlet Pimpernel in the novel by the same name
 Marguerite Gautier, the heroine in the Alexandre Dumas fils novel La Dame aux Camelias
 Marguerite Volant, main character of the 1996 Canadian mini-series by the same name
 Marguerite Krux, financier of an expedition to a Lost World in the late 1990s TV series The Lost World based on a book by Sir Arthur Conan Doyle
 Marguerite, the heroine of Gounod's opera Faust
 Marguerite Baker, an antagonist and member of the Baker family in the horror video game Resident Evil 7: Biohazard
 Marguerite Murphy; an elderly resident in Sunnyvale on the show Trailer Park Boys
 Marguerite Caine, main protagonist and heroine of Claudia Gray's "Firebird Series" beginning with "A Thousand Pieces of You"

As a surname
 Saison Marguerite, a supporting character in the web series The Most Popular Girls in School
 Tomoe Marguerite, in the anime and manga My-Otome

See also 

 Magritte
 Margueritte
 Marguerite (disambiguation)

References 

Feminine given names
French feminine given names
Given names derived from gemstones
Given names derived from plants or flowers